The 2019 Coventry City Council election was held on 2 May 2019 to elect members of Coventry City Council in England. This was on the same day as other local elections.

Residents in Allesley, Finham and Keresley areas of the City had the opportunity to elect Parish Councillors.

Current Council seats 
The table below shows a summary of the make-up of the City Council before the 2 May 2019 elections.

Key dates 

 3 April 2019 4pm: Deadline for those interested in standing as a candidate
 12 April 2019: Deadline for new applications to register in time to vote
 15 April 2019 5pm: Deadline for submitting applications to vote by post
 24 April 2019 5pm: Deadline for submitting applications to vote by proxy

All electors who are currently registered and are eligible to vote on Thursday 2 May should receive their polling card by 7 April.

Number of candidates by party

Election result in 2019

Ward results

Bablake

Binley and Willenhall

Cheylesmore

Earlsdon

Foleshill

Henley

Holbrook

Longford

Lower Stoke

Radford

Sherbourne

St. Michael's

Upper Stoke

Wainbody

Westwood

Whoberley

Woodlands

Wyken

References 

2019 English local elections
2019
2010s in Coventry
May 2019 events in the United Kingdom